Parma  is a village in the administrative district of Gmina Łowicz, within Łowicz County, Łódź Voivodeship, in central Poland.

The village is named after the Italian city of Parma. It was owned by Polish noblewoman Helena Radziwiłłowa, who probably founded the village.

During the invasion of Poland, which started World War II, on September 12, 1939, Germans murdered 32 Polish farmers in Parma, including 11 inhabitants of the village (see also Nazi crimes against the Polish nation). There is a memorial dedicated to the victims in the village.

References

 Central Statistical Office (GUS) Population: Size and Structure by Administrative Division - (2007-12-31) (in Polish)

Villages in Łowicz County